This is a list of events in British radio during 1976.

Events

January to February
No events.

March
 8 March – Radio 210 begins broadcasting to the Reading area.
 16 March – Independent Local Radio begins in Northern Ireland when Downtown Radio, begins broadcasting to the Belfast area.
 29 March – Former BBC Radio Birmingham presenter Les Ross joins the lineup at Birmingham station BRMB.

April
 12 April – Beacon Radio in the Wolverhampton area is the final station in the first wave of Independent Local Radio stations to begin transmission.

May
 2 May – BBC Radio 1 launches Playground – a "magazine programme of special interest to young listeners." The new programme incorporates Young Ideas in Action which has previously been broadcast as part of Junior Choice.
 17 May – BBC Radio Highland begins broadcasting programming in Gaelic.

June
No events.

July
No events.

August
No events.

September
12 September –  London Sounds Eastern launches on BBC Radio London and is the first Asian programme to be broadcast in English by the BBC. Previously Asian radio programmes in the United Kingdom were generally aired in the Hindi and Urdu languages.

October
No events.

November
No events.

December
Capital London launches the 'Capital Radio Helpline'.
The first Festive Fifty is revealed by John Peel on BBC Radio 1.

Unknown
Capital London launches the 'Flying Eye', a traffic spotting light aircraft, which reports on traffic congestion on the streets of Central London.
BBC Radio Leicester, responding to the growth of the size of the South Asian population and rising racial tension in Leicester, introduces a daily community show called 'Six Fifteen' aimed primarily at that community in the city.

Station debuts

8 March – Radio 210
16 March – Downtown Radio
12 April – Beacon Radio

Programme debuts
 4 January – Quote... Unquote on BBC Radio 4 (1976–2021)
 27 August – The Burkiss Way on BBC Radio 4 (1976–1980)
 30 September – The Food Programme on BBC Radio 4 (1976–present)
 Funny You Should Ask on BBC Radio 2 (1976–1982)
 Poetry Please on BBC Radio 4 (1976–present)

Continuing radio programmes

1940s
 Sunday Half Hour (1940–2018)
 Desert Island Discs (1942–Present)
 Down Your Way (1946–1992)
 Letter from America (1946–2004)
 Woman's Hour (1946–Present)
 A Book at Bedtime (1949–Present)

1950s
 The Archers (1950–Present)
 The Today Programme (1957–Present)
 The Navy Lark (1959–1977)
 Sing Something Simple (1959–2001)
 Your Hundred Best Tunes (1959–2007)

1960s
 Farming Today (1960–Present)
 In Touch (1961–Present)
 The Men from the Ministry (1962–1977)
 Petticoat Line (1965–1979)
 The World at One (1965–Present)
 The Official Chart (1967–Present)
 Just a Minute (1967–Present)
 The Living World (1968–Present)
 The Organist Entertains (1969–2018)

1970s
 PM (1970–Present)
 Start the Week (1970–Present)
 Week Ending (1970–1998)
 You and Yours (1970–Present)
 I'm Sorry I Haven't a Clue (1972–Present)
 Good Morning Scotland (1973–Present)
 Hello Cheeky (1973–1979)
 Kaleidoscope (1973–1998)
 Newsbeat (1973–Present)
 The News Huddlines (1975–2001)

Ending this year
 21 January – Petticoat Line (1965–1976)

Births
21 January – Emma Bunton, pop singer and broadcast presenter
February – Tom Sandars, radio continuity announcer and newsreader
23 March – Ed James, disc jockey
5 May – Tom Wrigglesworth, comedian
19 June – Lisa Shaw, radio presenter and journalist (died 2021) 
24 June – Zeb Soanes, radio newsreader, continuity announcer and children's author
8 August – Laura Kuenssberg, political journalist
9 August – Aled Haydn Jones, Welsh radio presenter and producer
September – Danny Robins, comedy scriptwriter
16 November – Danny Wallace,  filmmaker, comedian, writer, actor and broadcast presenter and producer
20 November – Debbie Barham, comedy scriptwriter (died 2003)
15 December – Chris Warburton, radio presenter

Deaths
15 May – David Munrow, early music performer and presenter (Pied Piper on BBC Radio 3), suicide (born 1942)

See also 
 1976 in British music
 1976 in British television
 1976 in the United Kingdom
 List of British films of 1976

References

Radio
British Radio, 1976 In
Years in British radio